Aron Tager (June 30, 1934 – February 28, 2019) was an American actor, poet, artist and sculptor.

Career
As an artist, Tager had numerous exhibitions of his work and has sculptures installed at the following locations: Mount Anthony Union High School (Bennington, Vermont); Shaftsbury Elementary School (Shaftsbury, Vermont); Delaware County Community College, (Media, Pennsylvania); and the Indianapolis Jewish Center, Battery Park (Burlington, Vermont).

He has earned a number of accolades for his work, including the Gold Key at the National Scholastic Art Competition in 1950, the 1975 Award and Medal at the Norwich University Art Show for "Best Sculpture" and "Most Popular Work in Show", and the Award and Medal, Boston Festival of the Arts, 1985.

Trained as an actor, Tager took a 25-year hiatus to focus solely on art, particularly painting and sculpture, before returning to acting in the early 1990s. He appeared in a variety of theatrical, television and film productions, and has had parts in the movies X-Men, Rocky Marciano, Serendipity, Murder at 1600, 10,000 Black Men Named George, A Holiday Romance, and The Salem Witch Trials.

A member of the repertory cast of the A&E TV series A Nero Wolfe Mystery (2001–2002), he has also appeared on the television shows At the Hotel, Kojak, Puppets Who Kill, Are You Afraid of the Dark?, Monk, Goosebumps, Wild Card, Sirens, Earth: Final Conflict, Lil' Bush, Psi Factor: Chronicles of the Paranormal, Due South, Wonderfalls, Blue Murder, Relic Hunter, The Zack Files and Billable Hours. He played Max Coleman in the 2002 made-for-TV movie Martin and Lewis.
  
A long-time resident of Toronto, Ontario, Canada, he appeared in television commercials and occasionally performed voices for characters in animated films, children's and adult shows such as Donkey Kong Country, Blazing Dragons, Adventures of the Little Mermaid, The Busy World of Richard Scarry, Monster Force, David Copperfield, Blazing Dragons, Stickin' Around, The Adventures of Sam & Max: Freelance Police, Silver Surfer, Tommy and the Wildcat, George Shrinks, Adventures in Animation 3D, Jane and the Dragon, The Dating Guy, The Adventures of Chuck and Friends.

Personal life
Tager was married to Ann Page, who was also an actress. They remained married until his death. His wife Ann Page died on 6th October 2020 at the age of 86.

Death
Tager died on February 28, 2019, at the age of 84 in Toronto, Ontario, Canada. His wife Ann died on October 6, 2020, at the age of 86. He is survived by four stepchildren, seven grandchildren, and his nephews.

Filmography

Film

Moïse (1990) -
Twin Sisters (1992) - Butler
Léolo (1992) - Fishmonger 
Canvas (1992) - Jimmy
Requiem for a Handsome Bastard (1992) - Emission télé
Mothers and Daughters (1992) - McEwan
Armen and Bullik (1993) - Charnac
Sweet Killing (1993) - Officer Lipsky
Because Why (1993) - Bert
Divine Fate (1993) - (voice)
David Copperfield (1993) - Additional voices
Warriors (1994) - General Moorhead
Highlander: The Final Dimension (1994) - Stosh
Dr. Jekyll and Mrs. Hyde (1995) - Lawyer
Curtis's Charm (1995) - Park Worker
Murder at 1600 (1997) - Treasury Guard #2
PSI Factor: Chronicles of the Paranormal (1997) - County Coroner Louis Arnold
Blind Faith (1998) - Judge Aker
Tommy and the Wildcat (1998) - Kalle Pokka (english, voice)
The Third Miracle (1999) - Cardinal Humes
X-Men (2000) - Emcee
Century Hotel (2001) - Older Salvatore
Serendipity (2001) - Janitor
Protection (2001) - Lujak
Touch (2002) - Trick #1
Fancy Dancing (2002) - Zero
Boys Briefs 2 (2002) - Trick #1
The Fur Store (2003) - 
Name of the Rose (2003) - Professor Wiseman
The Absence of Emily (2003) - Mr. Brewster
Adventures in Animation 3D (2004) - Fats, Phil Johnson (voices)
A Lobster Tale (2006) - Morty Thorpe
Boys Briefs 4 (2006) - Calvin
You Kill Me (2007) - Walter Fitzgerald
The Echo (2008) - Old Man
Green (2008) - Stanley
You Might as Well Live (2009) - Rabbi Kirshenblat
The Way It Used to Be (2009) - Alfred
The Untitled Work of Paul Shepard (2010) - Dr. Max Henreid
American Wife (2010) - Elderly Man
Serching for Wonder (2011) - Professor
Stag (2013) - Old Man
88 (2015) - Dale
He Never Died (2015) - Announcer

Television
Are You Afraid of the Dark? (1990–1994) - Dr. Vink, Zeebo, Carney, other various roles.
Samurai Pizza Cats (1991) - Additional voices (uncredited)
Adventures of the Little Mermaid (1991) - Anselm (voice)
Heritage Minutes (1991) - McFarlane
Urban Angel (1991) - The Printer
The Maharaja's Daughter (1994) - Police Captain
Monster Force (1994) - Additional voices
The Busy World of Richard Scarry (1993–1997) - Additional voices
Scoop III (1994) - Caissier smoked-meat
Tales of the Wild (1995) - McCready
Due Smith (1995–1997) - Tom, Bert Block, Nelson
Sirens (1995) - Tommy Flint, Gideon Wylie
TekWar (1995) - Alonzo Del Amo
The Hardy Boys (1995) - Jimmy
Where's the Money, Noreen? (1995) - Manager
Goosebumps (1995) - Dr. Shreek
Captive Heart: The James Mink Story (1996) - Conductor
Trilogy of Terror II (1996) - Steve
Blazing Dragons (1996–1998) - King Allfire (voice)
Stickin' Around (1996–1998) - Additional voices
Wind at My Back (1997) - Joe Willis
Jack Higgins's the Windsor Protocol (1997) - Uncle Misha
Donkey Kong Country (1997–2000) - Cranky Kong (voice)
The Adventures of Sam & Max: Freelance Police (1997–1998) - Additional voices
Peacekeepers (1997) - Mondolo
Silver Surfer (1998) - Master of Zenn-la (voice)
The Long Island Incident (1998) - Gun Salesman
His Bodyguard (1998) - Dr. Frank
Universal Soldier II: Brothers in Arms (1998) - John Devreaux
Universal Soldier III: Unfinished Business (1998) - John Devreaux
Earth: Final Conflict (1998) - Smackovich
Scandalous Me: The Jacqueline Susan Story (1998) - Producer One
Blaster's Universe (1999) -
The Devil's Arithmetic (1999) - Uncle Abe
My Gentleman Friends (1999) - Victor
Rocky Marciano (1999) - Charley Goldman
Relic Hunter (1999) - Lawrence Zale
Mr. Rock 'n' Roll: The Alan Freed Story (1999) - J. Edgar Hoover
A Holiday Romance (1999) - Joseph
Common Ground (2000) - Mr. Manos
George Shrinks (2000) - Big Ed (voice)
Santa Who? (2000) - Grandpa (Television Movie)
The Zack Files (2000) - Old Man
Chasing Cain (2000) - Rad
The Associates (2001) -
A Nero Wolfe Mystery (2001) - Commissioner Skinner, Mr. Carlisle, Commissioner Bernard Fromm
Life with Judy Garland: Me and My Shadows (2001) - George Jessel
Screech Owls (2001) - Grandfather
Thieves (2001) - Sid
Keep the Faith, Baby (2002) - Chairman Emanuel Celler
10,000 Black Men Named George (2002) - Governor Morrow
Monk (2002) - Leo Otterman
The Rats (2002) - Janitor
The Pact (2002) - Judge H. Rossiter
Martin and Lewis - Max Coleman
Second String (2002) - Charley Tuck
Salem Witch Trials (2002) - Giles Corey
Blue Murder (2003) - Motel Manager
Good Fences (2003) - Belcher
The One - Ace the Baker
Homeless to Harvard: The Liz Murray Story (2003) - Pops
Puppets Who Kill (2004) - Deprogrammer
Wonderfalls (2004) - Gwen
Lives of the Saints (2004) - Lawyer
Cool Money (2005) - Judge Raymond Ziff
Kojak (2005) - Grant Cleveland
Gold (2005) - Calvin
The Buck Calder Experience (2006) - Lou Blatts
At the Hotel (2006) - Norman
The Shakespeare Comedy Show (2006) - Lear
Jane and the Dragon (2006) - Sir Theodore Boarmaster (voice)
Dogasaur (2006) - Alfred lippe'
Billable Hours (2006–2008) - Mortie Fagen
Master of Horror (2007) - George Graham
The Jon Dore Television Show (2009) - Mr. Pansky
The Dating Guy (2009) - Captain Steiner (voice)
Lost Girl (2010) - Mayer
Babar and the Adventures of Badou (2010-2015) - General Huc (voice)
The Adventures of Chuck and Friends (2011) - Grandpa Treadwell, Salty Saul (voices)
Cybergeddon (2012) - Arthur Hastings
The Stanley Dynamic (2014–2016) - Walter Floggins
Hard Rock Medical (2015) - Fred
Vox (2015) - Fernando Moroso
Heroes Reborn (2015) - Old Angry Guy
You Got Trumped: The First 100 Days (2016) - Klaus
Ransom (2017) - Grandfather
My 90-Year-Old Roommate (2018) - Harry

Video games
Suikoden Tierkreis (2008) - Macoute

References

External links
Aron Tager website

1934 births
2019 deaths
American male television actors
American male voice actors
American people of Canadian descent
American emigrants to Canada
Male actors from New York City
People from Brooklyn